Pseudostomum klostermanni is a species of flatworms in the family Pseudostomidae. It is a marine species found in the Black and Mediterranean Seas and in the European waters of the North Atlantic Ocean.

References

External links 
 
 Pseudostomum klostermanni at the World Register of Marine Species (WoRMS)

Turbellaria
Animals described in 1874